Szikszó is a district in central-northern part of Borsod-Abaúj-Zemplén County. Szikszó is also the name of the town where the district seat is found. The district is located in the Northern Hungary Statistical Region.

Geography 
Szikszó District borders with Encs District northeast, Szerencs District to the southeast, Miskolc District to the southwest, Edelény District to the west. The number of the inhabited places in Szikszó District is 24.

Municipalities 
The district has 1 town and 23 villages.
(ordered by population, as of 1 January 2012)

The bolded municipality is the city.

Demographics

In 2011, it had a population of 17,507 and the population density was 57/km².

Ethnicity
Besides the Hungarian majority, the main minorities are the Roma (approx. 3,500) and Rusyn (100).

Total population (2011 census): 17,507
Ethnic groups (2011 census): Identified themselves: 20,043 persons:
Hungarians: 16,316 (81.40%)
Gypsies: 3,434 (17.13%)
Others and indefinable: 293 (1.46%)
Approx. 2,500 persons in Szikszó District did declare more than one ethnic group at the 2011 census.

Religion
Religious adherence in the county according to 2011 census:

Catholic – 9,511 (Roman Catholic – 6,979; Greek Catholic – 2,529); 
Reformed – 4,254;
Evangelical – 46;
other religions – 112; 
Non-religious – 733; 
Atheism – 44;
Undeclared – 2,807.

Gallery

See also
List of cities and towns of Hungary

References

External links
 Postal codes of the Szikszó District

Districts in Borsod-Abaúj-Zemplén County